Poole Hill is a summit in the U.S. state of Oregon.

Poole Hill was named in the 1860s after Arthur Pool, although the spelling differs.

References

Mountains of Jackson County, Oregon
Mountains of Oregon